WJXB-FM (97.5 MHz, "B97.5") is a radio station licensed to serve Knoxville, Tennessee, United States. The station is owned by Duke Wright, through licensee Midwest Communications, Inc.

WJXB-FM broadcasts an adult contemporary music format. The station was formerly a beautiful music station known as WEZK. The station was assigned the WJXB-FM call sign by the Federal Communications Commission on January 21, 2002.

It was announced on May 28, 2014 that Midwest Communications will purchase 9 of the 10 Stations owned by South Central Communications (this includes WJXB-FM along with Sister Stations WIMZ-FM & WVRX). With this purchase, Midwest Communications will expand its portfolio of stations to Evansville, Knoxville and Nashville. The sale was finalized on September 2, 2014, at a price of $72 million.

Translators
WJXB-FM programming is also carried on a broadcast translator station to extend or improve the coverage area of the station.

References

External links
B 97.5 Knoxville Facebook

JXB-FM
Mainstream adult contemporary radio stations in the United States
Midwest Communications radio stations